NHN may refer to:

 NHN Corporation, the previous name of South Korean firm which later split into Naver Corporation and NHN Corporation
 Nickel hydrazine nitrate, an explosive
 Normalhöhennull, the standard geographical height system used in Germany
 New Hampshire Northcoast Corporation, a US railroad company